Malala primarily refers to Malala Yousafzai, a Pakistani girls' education activist and 2014 Nobel Peace Prize winner.

Malala may also refer to:
 He Named Me Malala, a documentary film about Malala Yousafzai
 316201 Malala, an asteroid named in honour of Malala Yousafzai
 Malala (village), a village in India
 Malalai of Maiwand, a female national folk hero of Afghanistan, also known as Malala
 Mala language, a Papuan language, also known as Malala language
Mallala, South Australia, a city in Australia